Gladbrook is a city in Tama County, Iowa, United States. The population was 799 at the time of the 2020 census.

History
A post office called Gladbrook has been in operation since 1880. The name Gladbrook was coined by a railroad official.

On March 21, 1910, the Green Mountain train wreck occurred between Gladbrook and Green Mountain, in which a derailment killed more than 50 people riding on the Chicago, Rock Island and Pacific Railroad line.

Geography
Gladbrook is located at  (42.184995, -92.714588).

Demographics

2010 census
At the 2010 census, there were 945 people, 410 households and 251 families living in the city. The racial make-up of the city was 98.8% White, 0.5% from other races, and 0.6% from two or more races. Hispanic or Latino of any race were 1.0% of the population.

There were 410 households, of which 25.1% had children under the age of 18 living with them, 50.7% were married couples living together, 7.1% had a female householder with no husband present, 3.4% had a male householder with no wife present, and 38.8% were non-families. 33.9% of all households were made up of individuals and 21.2% had someone living alone who was 65 years of age or older. The average household size was 2.19 and the average family size was 2.78.

The median age was 47.2 years. 20.2% of residents were under the age of 18, 6.1% were between the ages of 18 and 24, 20.7% were from 25 to 44, 25.7% were from 45 to 64 and 27.3% were 65 years of age or older. The sex make-up of the city was 45.3% male and 54.7% female.

2000 census
At the 2000 census, there were 1,015 people, 408 households and 263 families living in the city. The racial make-up of the city was 98.82% White, 0.10% African American, 0.49% Native American, 0.10% from other races and 0.49% from two or more races. Hispanic or Latino of any race were 0.89% of the population.

There were 408 households, of which 29.7% had children under the age of 18 living with them, 52.7% were married couples living together, 8.3% had a female householder with no husband present and 35.3% were non-families. 31.1% of all households were made up of individuals, and 21.3% had someone living alone who was 65 years of age or older. The average household size was 2.35 and the average family size was 2.91.

24.9% of the population were under the age of 18, 5.9% from 18 to 24, 24.2% from 25 to 44, 16.9% from 45 to 64 and 28.0% were 65 years of age or older. The median age was 42 years. For every 100 females, there were 79.3 males under 18. For every 100 females age 18 and over, there were 79.7 males.

The median household income was $38,167 and the median family income was $41,797. Males had a median income of $34,028 and females $21,161. The per capita income was $18,484. About 4.2% of families and 6.3% of the population were below the poverty line, including 11.3% of those under age 18 and 4.3% of those age 65 or over.

Arts and culture

Annual cultural events
The Gladbrook Corn Carnival is an annual celebration that attracts several thousand visitors per year. It has been held since 1922, generally in the last weekend of June with a variety of events held from Thursday to Sunday.

Museums
Gladbrook is the site of the Matchstick Marvels Museum which holds large creations built by Patrick Acton that are made out of matchsticks. Many of his creations are displayed in Ripley's Believe It or Not! museums.

Parks and recreation
Gladbrook has a movie theater, a 24-hour fitness center, and a bike and walking trail.

Union Grove Park
Union Grove State Park is located three miles south of Gladbrook. It has a public beach, several picnic areas, public fishing, campgrounds and short hiking trails.

Education
The city is served by the Gladbrook–Reinbeck Community School District. Gladbrook Community School District consolidated on July 1, 1988. Students attend school in nearby Reinbeck. Previously there was an elementary and middle school in Gladbrook, but it closed in 2015.

Notable person

Clifford Berry, who helped John Vincent Atanasoff to create the first digital electronic computer in 1939, the Atanasoff–Berry Computer at Iowa State, was born here.

References

External links
 Gladbrook Community website
 Gladbrook-Reinbeck Schools website

Cities in Iowa
Cities in Tama County, Iowa